Ballad in Blue (originally titled Blues for Lovers) is a 1965 British drama music film starring R&B legend Ray Charles. The film was the last to be directed by Paul Henreid.

Plot
Ray Charles helps blind boy David in his struggle to regain his sight. However, David's overprotective mother Peggy is afraid of the risks connected with restoring David's sight. Ray tries to help the family, offering Peggy's heavy-drinking partner Steve an opportunity to work with Ray's band.

Fashion designer Gina tries to lure Steve. Margaret encourages David to sneak out and wander around London late at night on a mischievous adventure.

Cast
 Ray Charles as himself
 Tom Bell as Steve Collins
 Mary Peach as Peggy Harrison
 Dawn Addams as Gina Graham
 Piers Bishop as David
 Betty McDowall as Mrs. Babbidge
 Lucy Appleby as Margaret
 Joe Adams as Fred
 Robert Lee Ross as Duke Wade
 Anne Padwick as Bus driver
 Monika Henreid as Antonia
 Brendan Agnew as Antonia's protector
 Vernon Hayden as Headmaster
 Leo McCabe as Doctor Leger
 The Raelettes as Themselves

References

External links
 

1965 films
1965 drama films
Films directed by Paul Henreid
British drama films
1960s English-language films
1960s British films